The Saxon-Upper Lusatian Railway Company (Sächsisch-Oberlausitzer Eisenbahngesellschaft or SOEG) is a German railway company based in Saxony. It is the owner and operator of the Zittau narrow gauge railway.

History 
The SOEG was founded on 28 July 1994 by the district of Zittau and several neighbouring communities on the Zittau railway. On 15 November 1996 it was given the licence for the narrow gauge line from Zittau to Oybin and Jonsdorf as an official railway operator and railway infrastructure company. On 1 December 1996 responsibility for working the narrow gauge line was finally transferred to the SOEG.

From 2002 to 2003 the SOEG had a stake in the Saxon-Bohemian Railway Company with its headquarters in Seifhennersdorf.

References 

Heritage railways in Germany
Railway lines in Saxony
Transport in Saxony
Zittau
Companies based in Saxony
1994 establishments in Germany
Railway companies established in 1994